The 1898 Clemson Tigers football team represented Clemson Agricultural College—now known as Clemson University–during the 1898 Southern Intercollegiate Athletic Association football season.  The Tigers completed their third season as an independent with a record of 3–1, with wins over Bingham Military School, South Carolina, and Georgia Tech, and a loss to Georgia.  For the first time, Clemson played a game at home, on October 20 against Bingham Military School, and a neutral site game at Augusta, Georgia against Georgia Tech.  John Penton served as the team's coach for his first season while Shack Shealy was the captain.

Schedule

References

Clemson
Clemson Tigers football seasons
Clemson Tigers football